is a Japanese weightlifter. Saito represented Japan at the 2008 Summer Olympics in Beijing, where she competed for the women's light heavyweight category (69 kg). Saito placed eighth in this event, as she successfully lifted 87 kg in the single-motion snatch, and hoisted 122 kg in the two-part, shoulder-to-overhead clean and jerk, for a total of 209 kg.

References

External links
 
 

1983 births
Living people
Olympic weightlifters of Japan
Weightlifters at the 2008 Summer Olympics
Sportspeople from Kyoto Prefecture
Weightlifters at the 2002 Asian Games
Japanese female weightlifters
Asian Games competitors for Japan
21st-century Japanese women